"The Nose" (Russian: Нос Nos) is a satirical short story by Nikolai Gogol written during his time living in St. Petersburg. During this time, Gogol's works were primarily focused on the grotesque and absurd, with a romantic twist. Written between 1835 and 1836, "The Nose" tells the story of a St. Petersburg official whose nose leaves his face and develops a life of its own. "The Nose" was originally published in The Contemporary, a literary journal owned by Alexander Pushkin. The use of a nose as the main source of conflict in the story could have been due to Gogol's own experience with an oddly shaped nose, which was often the subject of self-deprecating jokes in letters. The use of iconic landmarks in the story, as well as the sheer absurdity of the story, has made "The Nose" an important part of St. Petersburg's literary tradition.

"The Nose" is divided into three parts and tells the story of Collegiate Assessor ('Major') Kovalyov, who wakes up one morning without his nose. He later finds out that his nose has developed a life of its own, and has apparently surpassed him by attaining the rank of State Councillor. The short story showcases the obsession with social rank that plagued Russia after Peter the Great introduced the Table of Ranks. By allowing commoners to gain hereditary nobility through service to the state, a huge population was given the chance to move up in social status. This opportunity, however, also gave way to large bureaucracies, in which many of Gogol's characters worked.

Plot

The story is divided into three parts:

Part one
On 25 March, the barber Ivan Yakovlevich finds out that his wife has made bread. During breakfast, he cuts a loaf in half and finds a nose in his bread. With horror, he recognizes this nose as that of one of his regular customers, Collegiate Assessor Kovalyov (known as 'Major Kovalyov'). Ivan's wife demands that Ivan remove the nose from her home, so he wraps it up in cloth and attempts to throw it off a bridge. He tries to get rid of the nose by throwing it into the Neva River, but he is caught by a police officer. Ivan attempts to bribe the police officer, but the officer refuses.

Part two
Major Kovalyov awakens to discover that his nose is missing. He grabs a mirror to see his face, and there is only a smooth, flat patch of skin in its place. He leaves his home to report the incident to the chief of police. On his way to the chief of police, Major Kovalyov sees his nose dressed in the uniform of a high-ranking official. His nose is already pretending to be a human. He chases his nose, who refuses to return to his face. Kovalyov becomes distracted by a pretty girl, and while he is not watching, the nose escapes. Kovalyov attempts to contact the chief of police, but he is not home. So he visits the newspaper office to place an advertisement about the loss of his nose, but is refused. He then speaks to a police inspector who also refuses to help. Finally, Kovalyov returns home. Kovalyov returns to his flat, where the police officer who caught Ivan returns the nose (which was apprehended at a coach station, trying to flee the city). Kovalyov's joy is cut short when he finds out that he is unable to reattach the nose, even with the help of a doctor. The next day, Kovalyov writes a letter to Madame Alexandra Grigorievna Podtochina, a woman who wants him to marry her daughter, and accuses her of stealing his nose; he believes that she has placed a curse on him for his fickleness toward her daughter. He writes to ask her to undo the spell, but she is confused by his letter, and reiterates her desire to have him marry her daughter. Her reply convinces him that she is innocent. In the city, rumours of the nose's activities have spread, and crowds gather in search of it.

Part three
On 7 April, Kovalyov wakes up with his nose reattached. He is carefully shaved by the barber and returns to his old habits of shopping and flirting with girls.

Characters 
 Collegiate Assessor Kovalyov – the main character of the story is a civil servant of average rank. He is obsessed with his rank, and one day, he wakes up to find his nose missing.
 The Nose – this character is a body part that is personified in the story. By the way it is dressed, it seems to have achieved a higher rank of civil service than Kovalyov.  
 Ivan Yakovlevitch – he is the barber who finds the nose in his bread. He attempts to throw the nose into the river. When the nose is miraculously reattached to Kovalyov again, he comes to Ivan to get shaved. 
 Newspaper Advertising Clerk – he is who Kovalyov contacts to get an ad in the paper about his missing nose. When the newspaper advertising clerk first hears about the story, he is unable to understand what has happened. He rejects Kovalyov's ad because he believes that the ridiculousness of the story will make the newspaper look too sensational. 
 Madame Podtochina – she is the mother of the girl that Kovalyov has been flirting with for some time. He refuses to propose to her because he believes he can marry someone even better, so Madame Podtochina is constantly bothering him about marrying her daughter.
The doctor

Themes

Olfactory perception 
Some reviewers analyze the story literally instead of searching for symbolic significance. A literal interpretation suggests that Gogol's story is about the importance of olfactory perception, which is obscured in Western society by a focus on vision and appearance. This interpretation is consistent with Gogol's belief that the nose is the most important part of a person's anatomy. Major Kovalyov obsesses over his appearance, cleanliness and rank. His behavior reflects the influence of vision-oriented Western culture that emphasizes deodorization and hygiene. And yet he is deeply upset when he loses his nose, which shows that olfactory sensation is still important despite Western influence.

Society and class 
Society and class played a very important role in determining one's life during the time of Gogol. With the introduction of the Table of Ranks by Peter the Great, a wholly new portion of the population was able to move up socially if it worked hard enough. In a society that was obsessed with status, people had to always look their best and prioritize their outside appearance. When Major Kovalyov sees his own nose dressed in the uniform of a higher-ranking official than himself, he is momentarily embarrassed and unable to approach the nose. Even within the context of a ridiculous scenario, feelings of inferiority and jealousy still manage to creep into Major Kovalyov's mind.

Identity 
The theme of identity is highlighted by how the nose is both easy to identify and hard to identify at various points in the story. The barber notices the owner of the nose very quickly when he sees it. However, the nose is able to slip away from Kovalyov by disguising itself as a doctor. This back and forth between the identity of the nose emphasizes how Gogol's Petersburg valued outward appearance much more than one's true identity. Major Kovalyov is a minor official who acts like he is much higher ranking than he actually is. He refers to women as prostitutes and asks them to come to his apartment. His main objectives in life are to climb the table of ranks and marry well, but without his nose, he can do neither.

The supernatural 
The supernatural also comes into play in this story. The nose is able to transform its size depending on what is needed to further the plot. Sometimes it is portrayed as the size of a common nose, while other times it is portrayed as the same size as a human. This strange ability plays into the absurdity of the story and adds to its comedic tone.

Style 
Critics note that the story's title in Russian (Нос, "Nos") is the reverse of the Russian word for "dream" (Сон, "Son"). As the unreliable narrator himself notes, the story "contains much that is highly implausible", while an earlier version of the story ended with Kovalyov waking and realizing that the story was indeed a dream. Without the awakening, however, the story becomes a precursor of magical realism, as an unreal element is woven into a realistic narration. Critics also note the abrupt changes in the narrative that appear to them to be pieced together like fragments. The story line appears to have multiple branches to facilitate the nature of unpredictability as a theme in the story.

Major Kovalyov is a person with many inconsistencies and contradictions. Gogol uses this to highlight the "fractured identity of the main character." There is a significant imbalance on how Kovalyov views himself, and how the outside world perceives him. Rather than focusing on his inner appearance, all of his energy and thought goes towards maintaining his outward appearance. "The collegiate assessor’s private and public faces seem almost unrelated." This kind of portrayal of an average citizen of Saint Petersburg reflects Gogol's position as a transplant to the city, who views the social hierarchy of the city from an outside perspective.

At the end of the story, it appears that Gogol is talking directly to the reader. It is never explained why the Nose fell off in the first place, why it could talk, nor why it found itself reattached. By doing this, Gogol was playing on the assumptions of readers, who may happily seek absurd stories but at the same time still want a normal explanation.

Symbolism 
In Russia, the nose has been host to a variety of proverbs that range from "torn off" (if it is too curious), "lifted up" (if you have a high opinion of yourself), or "hung up" (with obvious defeat and failure). By the 19th century, there has been an extensive literature in Russian prose dedicated to nose references. Critic V. V. Vinogradov believes the nose is not only a symbol of human personality, it is also a source of comedy and pathos in literature.

Some critics have equated the garbled language between Kovalyov's nose and the other characters in the story to mythological consciousness. Due to the situation the characters find themselves in, human qualities are transferred to natural objects and a mythological sense of perception pervades the characters' thoughts as opposed to the former modern man perception noted for its self-interest consciousness. The story juxtaposes the nose as a symbol of salvation for Major Kovalyov as opposed to a symbol of self-destruction for barber Ivan Yakovlevitch.

His nose serves as a symbol of his own snobbery and pretentious attitude. Once he loses his nose, his entire demeanor towards the world changes. His nose acts as the source of his own pride, and is what allows him to look down on everyone else. The loss of his nose represents a loss of his identity. Since his identity is primarily defined by his outward appearance, the loss of that appearance devastates him.

Inspiration and reception 
As a literary theme, the nose had been treated by Russian authors at least ever since the translation, completed in 1807, of Laurence Sterne's Tristram Shandy, in which the subject of noses is elaborately dealt with, especially in "Slawkenbergius's Tale". Noses, and even heads, which run about on their own, which disappear and then return, which are even baked in bread (as in Part I of Gogol's story), are to be found in Russian literature of the 1820s and 1830s. Out of these works, Gogol's is the most famous because it presents an absurd tale that not only serves as social commentary, but also as a comedic tale for all ages.

In A History of Russian Literature, the critic D.S. Mirsky writes: "The Nose is a piece of sheer play, almost sheer nonsense. In it more than anywhere else Gogol displays his extraordinary magic power of making great comic art out of nothing."

Ever since it was published, "The Nose" has intrigued critics with its absurd story and social commentary. The absurdity of the story creates a certain distance between the author and the reader, which provides an opportunity for readers to enjoy the comedic aspects of the story, but closer analysis allows readers to see that the story is a critique of their everyday lives.

Saint Petersburg landmarks 
As a Petersburg tale, "The Nose" has many references to the city of Saint Petersburg, where the action of the story takes place. 

 Voznesensky Avenue: Ivan, the barber, lives on this street.
 Isaakievsky Bridge: Ivan throws the nose into the river Neva from this bridge.
 Sadovaya Street: Major Kovalyov lives on this street.
 Nevsky Prospect: Major Kovalyov takes daily walks down this street.
 Tavrichevsky Gardens: A rumor arises that the nose took to walking in these gardens
 Gostiny Dvor: Major Kovalyov stops here, happily, after his nose returns to his face

Adaptations
Dmitri Shostakovich's opera The Nose, first performed in 1930, is based on this story.

A short film based on the story was made by Alexandre Alexeieff and Claire Parker in 1963 and used pinscreen animation.

Another animated short film, made in 1966, directed by Mordicai Gerstein and narrated by Brother Theodore, shifted the story to Pittsburgh and changed the names (the barber is named "Theodore Schneider" and the nose-loser is named "Nathan Nasspigel").

Rolan Bykov directed a TV film adapted from the story in 1977.Andrei Amalrik's play "Nose! Nose? No-se!", like Gogol's short story, features a Major Kovalyov who wanders around St. Petersburg in search of his nose. The Kovalyov in Amalrik's play lives in a Marxist totalitarian society and is excessively concerned about his middle-class status.

A play for radio based on the story was written by UK author Avanti Kumar and first produced and broadcast in Ireland by RTÉ in 1995.

In April 2002, the BBC Radio 4 comedy series Three Ivans, Two Aunts and an Overcoat broadcast an adaptation of the story starring Stephen Moore.

An album in Romanian, based on the story, was released by Ada Milea and Bogdan Burlăcianu in 2007.

A play based on the short story was written by Tom Swift and produced by The Performance Corporation in 2008.

The Fat Git Theatre Company performed their adaptation of the short story in 2011.

WMSE (91.7 FM in Milwaukee, WI) broadcast an adaptation  by Wisconsin Hybrid Theater (Radio WHT) in 2011.

The Moscow Museum of Erotic Art put on an adaptation based on Vladimir Putin losing his genitalia to coincide with the 2012 presidential election.

Due to the popularity of Gogol's works in Russia and beyond, many cultural monuments to his works, including The Nose have been created.

A translated audio book version of the short story was published in Malayalam by Kathacafe in 2017.

In January 2020, Andrei Khrzhanovsky released the official adaptation of the short story, The Nose or the Conspiracy of Mavericks, as a stop-motion animated film.

See also 
 Saint Petersburg
 Table of Ranks
 Nikolai Gogol
 Kazan Cathedral, Saint Petersburg
 Nevsky Prospect

References

External links

 
The Nose, English translation, from Project Gutenberg
Bibliomania: Free Online Literature and Study Guides: The Nose
Monument to Major Kovalyov's Nose
 (in German)

Short stories by Nikolai Gogol
1836 short stories
Magic realism
Short stories set in the Russian Empire
Short stories adapted into films